The Christian Festival Association was formed in September 2006. The group consists of members representing major Christian music festivals held in the United States and Canada. Collectively, this group represents nearly a million attendees annually, whose events are held annually between April and October.  The association's Executive Director is Julie Klinger and the organization is headquartered in Sioux Falls, South Dakota.

Member festivals

The members of the CFA include:

Kingdom Bound – Darien Center, New York
Lifest – Oshkosh, Wisconsin
Rock the Desert – Midland, Texas
SoulFest – Gilford, New Hampshire
Spirit West Coast – Del Mar, California
Spirit West Coast – Ontario, California
Spirit West Coast – Norco, California
Unity Christian Music Festival – Muskegon, Michigan

References
 "“AC & Brady" NAMED WINNERS OF CHRISTIAN FESTIVAL ASSOCIATION'S 2018 NATIONAL TALENT SEARCH COMPETITION". 2018. News article.
 "“Alive|City” Named Winner of Christian Festival Association’s 2017 National Talent Search Competition". 2017. GMA news article.
 "Christian Festival Association Makes Industry Impact". 2010. CMSpin news article.
 "Association of Christian Festival Operators Formed". 2006. Christian Festival Association Press Release.
 "Christian Music Festivals". 2007. Christian Music Daily article.
 
 "Christian Festival Association Previews Artists for 2009". 2008. Gospel Music Association Newswire article.
 "Christian Festival Association Names Executive Director". 2013. Christian Festival Association Press Release
 "". 2015. RevivedMusic.com news article.
 "". 2015. Christian Festival Association Membership Grows to All-Time High.

External links
Christian Festival Association Home

Christian mass media companies